The First Battle of El Djorf (or El-Djorf) took place on 22 September 1955, during the Algerian War, between the National Liberation Army and the French Army.

Background 
The battle occurred a year after the start of the Algerian War. It took place in the Aurès, the mountainous terrain where the war started. The French military had arrested Mostefa Ben Boulaïd, who was the head of the Algerian National Liberation Army in that region.

An internal conflict in the ALN resulted in Colonel Bachir Chihani being named head of the Willaya I. He started by gathering the troops that had dispersed over the region, and managed to organize a meeting in the region of El Djorf, north of current Tebessa Province. This meeting was aimed at reorganising the troops to relaunch military activities. 300 fighters attended this meeting.

The French army launched Operation "Timgad" and had no idea that it was about to fall on the meeting of the chiefs of Aurès and Nementchas that Bachir Chihani had organised between 18 and 23 September 1955.

Battle 
During the battle, Adjel Adjoul was capturaed and taken prisoner. The FLN casualties were 45 killed and 40 wounded and captured, while French losses were very few according to the French government. The battle is considered a French victory by the French government. Alistair Horne, one of the most infamous writers on the subject of the Algerian war lists the French sources and writes off the battle as an important French victory, and a cause for the weakening of the Auresian wilaya. The Algerian government on the other hand, claims that the battle was a resounding FLN victory. According to the Algerian government  losses of the French army were as follows: between 400 and 800 dead and more than 1,500 wounded. As well as the loss of large amounts of ammunition 44, the loss of 100 soldiers, the downing of eight aircraft and the destruction of three armored vehicles. 45 and about 150 pieces of weapons such as automatic rifles (50 guns) and others . As for the losses of the National Liberation Army, estimates varied, and in general, they range between 60 and 70 dead and 60-90 Wounded, and 15 weapons lost, it was not possible to keep them on the night of going out while on a mule convoy.

Aftermath 
The leaders blamed Bachir Chihani for his recklessness in organising a rally as important as the one in El-Djorf, neglecting the basic rules of security, and call for self-criticism on his part, which did not come.

In the context of the war of memories with the former colonial power, the Algerian authorities decided to make the Battle of El Djorf, which took place from 20 to 28 September 1955 in the Nemenchas Mountains in eastern Algeria, a place of memory for the Algerian nation in the 2000s.

Bibliography

References 

El Djorf
1955 in Algeria
El Djorf
September 1955 events in Africa